Dendropupidae is an extinct family of fossil land snails in the clade Caenogastropoda.

References

 The Taxonomicon

 
Prehistoric gastropods